Armide was a submarine ordered by the Japanese Navy from the Schneider-Creusot shipyard before World War I but was requisitioned by the French government before it was launched. Armide operated in the Mediterranean during the course of World War I and was stricken from the Navy list in July 1932.

Design

Propulsion while surfaced was provided by two diesel motors built by the Swiss manufacturer Schneider-Carels producing in total  and for submerged running two electric motors producing in total .

Armide was armed with six  torpedo tubes and a  L/50 M1902 Hotchkiss deck gun. The crew of the submarine consisted of 31 officers and seamen.

Service 

Armide was ordered in 1911 by the Imperial Japanese Navy and was designed by Maxime Laubeuf. The ship was to receive the number 14 in Japan (第 14 号艦) but it was requisitioned by the French government on 3 June 1915, after which the Japanese themselves built a replacement No 14 to the same design, ordering the diesel engines from France.

The Armide was built in the Schneider shipyard in Chalon-sur-Saône, France. The keel was laid down in 1912, it was launched in July 1915, and was completed in June 1916.

Armide operated in the Mediterranean during the course of World War I and was stricken from the Navy list in July 1932. Armide was given the pennant number of SD 2.

References

Citations 

 

World War I submarines of France
Armide-class submarines
1915 ships